Mehnagar is one of the taluka in Azamgarh district of province Uttar Pradesh in India. It includes Kalanderpur.

References

Cities and towns in Azamgarh district